Monochamus tropicalis is a species of beetle in the family Cerambycidae. It was described by Elizabeth S. Dillon and Lawrence S. Dillon in 1961, originally under the genus Ethiopiochamus.

References

tropicalis
Beetles described in 1961